Rachel McLauchlan (born 7 July 1997) is a Scottish footballer, who plays as a winger for Rangers Women and defender for the Scotland women's national football team. She previously played for Yeovil Town in England's Women's Super League (FA WSL) as well as Inverness City,  Aberdeen, and Hibernian.

Club career
McLauchlan started her senior career at Inverness City, then transferred to Aberdeen in August 2014. In January 2016 she joined Hibernian.

McLauchlan moved to English club Yeovil Town in January 2019. She returned to Scottish football in July 2019, signing for Glasgow City.

During the 2020–21 SWPL season, McLaughlan scored a goal during the team's 2-0 season opener against Celtic F.C. Women.

In January 2021, McLauchlan joined Rangers Women on a pre-contract agreement arranged in summer 2020.

International career
McLauchlan made her debut for the Scotland national team in a 7–0 friendly thrashing by the Netherlands, in Livingston, in October 2016. She entered play as an 86th-minute substitute for Hibs teammate Kirsty Smith. In June 2017, Scotland coach Anna Signeul named McLauchlan in her squad for Euro 2017.

Honours

Club
Hibernian
 Scottish Women's Premier League Cup: 2016, 2017, 2018
 Scottish Women's Cup: 2016, 2017, 2018
Glasgow City
 Scottish Women's Premier League: 2019
 Scottish Women's Cup: 2019
Rangers
 Scottish Women's Premier League: 2021-22
 Scottish Women's Premier League Cup: 2022
 City of Glasgow Woman's Cup: 2022

References

External links
 
 

1997 births
Living people
Scottish women's footballers
Scotland women's international footballers
Hibernian W.F.C. players
Scottish Women's Premier League players
Women's association football wingers
Yeovil Town L.F.C. players
Glasgow City F.C. players
Aberdeen F.C. Women players
Rangers W.F.C. players
UEFA Women's Euro 2017 players